Golam Mohiuddin was an Indian politician. He represented the Nalhati constituency in the West Bengal Legislative Assembly 1967–1977, contesting elections on an independent ticket. In the 1967 West Bengal Legislative Assembly election, he ran on an obtained 7,664 votes (27.41%). In the 1969 West Bengal Legislative Assembly election, he obtained 16,180 votes (53.73%). In the 1971 West Bengal Legislative Assembly election, he obtained 10,184 votes (39.66%). In the 1972 West Bengal Legislative Assembly election, he obtained 12,932 votes (46.11%). He didn't contest the 1977 West Bengal Legislative Assembly election.

References

Year of birth missing
Possibly living people
West Bengal MLAs 1967–1969
West Bengal MLAs 1969–1971
West Bengal MLAs 1971–1972
West Bengal MLAs 1972–1977
Independent politicians in India